KUPB (channel 18) is a television station licensed to Midland, Texas, United States, serving the Permian Basin area as an affiliate of the Spanish-language Univision network. The station is owned by Entravision Communications, and has studios on Younger Road in Midland; its transmitter is located on University Boulevard in West Odessa.

History
The station commenced broadcasting on analog channel 18 on May 14, 2001. KUPB moved to digital broadcasting on June 12, 2009 at 9:00 a.m., "flash-cutting" to digital channel 18 after a temporary (3 minutes) signal outage. (KUPB was granted a construction permit after the Federal Communications Commission finalized the digital television allotment plan on April 21, 1997; as a result, the station did not receive a companion channel for a digital television station.)  KUPB moved to high definition (1080i) at 10 a.m. on May 3, 2010.

In 2013, KUPB added a secondary station, KUPB-DT2, and began airing ZUUS Latino on 18.2. In 2014, it removed ZUUS Latino and replaced it with LATV.

In 2018, KUPB added two additional subchannels that broadcast English programming.

News operation

Noticias 18 was launched on November 5, 2007 to provide news for the viewers in the Permian Basin. KUPB had been airing two-minute newsbriefs since August 2003.  On October 13, 2008, the name of the newscast was changed to Noticias Univision Oeste de Texas and began to be simulcast on San Angelo sister station KEUS-LP. In 2015, Entravision transferred production of KUPB's newscasts to El Paso sister station KINT-TV.

Technical information

Subchannels
The station's digital signal is multiplexed:

References

External links

 

Television channels and stations established in 2001
2001 establishments in Texas
UPB
Spanish-language television stations in Texas
Entravision Communications stations